Rockyford/Early Bird Air Aerodrome  is located  west southwest of Rockyford, Alberta, Canada.

References

Registered aerodromes in Alberta
Wheatland County, Alberta